The Pico Formation is a Pliocene epoch stratigraphic unit and geologic formation in the greater Los Angeles Basin, the Santa Monica Mountains, and the Santa Susana Mountains, in Los Angeles County of Southern California.

Geology
It was formed during the Neogene period of the Cenozoic Era, and overlies the Repetto Formation.

Outcrops of the formation in Santa Monica Mountains National Recreation Area have produced fossil shark teeth from the Pliocene.

Classification
The underlying Repetto Formation is equivalent in age to the Fernando Formation, and some researchers consider it as well as the overlying Pico Formation to be a junior synonym based on benthic foraminifera stages. Other researchers maintain that the Repetto and Pico Formations are distinct stratigraphic units, and that the use of the name "Fernando Formation" should be stopped due to several issues with stratigraphic correlation and access to the type section.

See also

References

Pliocene California
Geology of Los Angeles County, California
Geologic formations of California
Natural history of the Santa Monica Mountains